The statue of Robert the Bruce on the esplanade at Stirling Castle, Stirling, is a 1876 work sculpted by Andrew Currie and designed by illustrator George Cruikshank. As of 2020, the statue is featured on the Clydesdale Bank £20 note.

Description
The stone sculpture depicts Robert the Bruce in chain mail with his hand on the pommel of his sword. To the back side is his shield and axe. On the plinth is a shield with a lion rampant. The figure faces south, towards the location of the Battle of Bannockburn. The statue is a C listed building.

See also
 Cultural depictions of Robert the Bruce
 List of public art in Stirling
 1876 in art

References

Buildings and structures in Stirling (city)
Outdoor sculptures in Scotland
1876 sculptures
Statues in Scotland
Listed sculptures in Scotland
Category C listed buildings in Stirling (council area)
Robert the Bruce